Canton High School is a public high school in Canton, Mississippi. It is part of the Canton Public School District. All of the student body is categorized as economically disadvantaged and almost 100 percent are African American.

Tigers are the school mascot and the school colors are blue and white.

The school's football team dates to 1910. It has an 0-10 playoff record. Calvin Bolton is the team's coach.

History
Canton High School was established in 1874.The school's historic building was designed by Jackson architect N. W. Overstreet and built in 1923. It closed in 1969, but has since been used as a furniture store and church.

Madison County Training School served the area. A. M. Rogers High School was dedicated in 1958 in the wake of Brown v Board of Education and served the area's African American students. Students protested poor conditions and supplies. Canton School Superintendent D. M. Allen touted investments in segregated schools and criticized the pulling of students in protests during 1964. In 1964, parents attempted to register their children at Belmont High School decrying the poor conditions and limited offerings available to them at the city's segregated schools. In 1969, the school was renamed to Canton High School after the historic building closed.

In 2015, the original 1923 Canton High School building and its additions were renovated for use as apartments.

Alumni
 Damien Lewis, football player
George Doherty, football player and coach
Marsha Barbour, first lady of Mississippi from 2004 to 2012

See also
List of Mississippi Landmarks
National Register of Historic Places listings in Madison County, Mississippi

References

Public high schools in Mississippi
Schools in Madison County, Mississippi
School buildings on the National Register of Historic Places in Mississippi
National Register of Historic Places in Madison County, Mississippi
Educational institutions established in 1874
1874 establishments in Mississippi
Mississippi Landmarks